The Apple Multiple Scan 15 Display is a 13.3″ viewable shadow mask CRT that was manufactured by Apple Inc. from July 18, 1994, until September 14, 1996.  This monitor has built-in speakers that can be connected with a cable that has a male ″ stereo TRS connector on each end and there is also a headphone jack.  The video cable uses a standard Macintosh DA-15 video connector and the maximum resolution is 1024×768.

References 
 Apple support
 EveryMac.com

Apple Inc. peripherals
Apple Inc. displays